2016 census may refer to:

Alberta municipal censuses, 2016
2016 Australian census
2016 Canadian Census
Great Elephant Census